Reports on the number of people involved in criminal gangs, by locale.

United States 

There were at least 30,000 gangs and 800,000 gang members active across the US in 2007. 
About 900,000 gang members lived "within local communities across the country", and about 147,000 were in U.S. prisons or jails in 2009. By 1999, Hispanics accounted for 47% of all gang members, Blacks 31%, Whites 13%, and Asians 6%.

The Latin Kings have organized chapters in over 41 US states, most notably Illinois, and several Latin American and European countries, including: Mexico, Spain, Dominican Republic, Canada, Italy, Ecuador, Peru, Puerto Rico, Portugal, Brazil, United Kingdom and others.

Chicago 
The Chicago Crime Commission publication "The Gang Book 1012" gave the statistic that Chicago has more gang members than any other city in the  world with a reported population of 150,000. The city had 532 murders in 2012, however, it saw a decrease to 403 murders in 2013, but up to 762 in 2016. Not all murders are gang-related, but the Chicago Police Department states that 80% of all shootings and murders in the city are gang-related.

Los Angeles 
Los Angeles has held the nickname "gang capital America" since 1930 because approximately 120,000 gang members reside in the city, and tens of thousands more in surrounding Los Angeles County.

Latin America 
There are between 25,000 and 50,000 gang members in Central America's El Salvador.

The Mexican drug cartels have as many as 100,000 foot soldiers, many of them in the Los Angeles area.

Gangs controlled approximately 40% of Haiti's Port-au-Prince in 2022.

Asia 
The Yakuza are among the largest organized crime organizations in the world. In Japan, as of 2005, there are some 86,300 known members.

Hong Kong's Triads include up to 160,000 members in the 21st century. It was estimated that in the 1950s, there were 300,000 Triad members in Hong Kong. The Chinese government claims that police have eliminated 1,221 triad-style gangs across China since a crackdown was launched in 2006. More than 87,300 suspects have been arrested.

Europe 
The FBI estimates the size of the four Italian organized crime groups to be approximately 25,000 members and 250,000 affiliates worldwide.

Oceania

Australia 
In 2013, the Australian Crime Commission listed 4,483 outlaw motorcycle (OMC) gang members in 179 chapters of 44 OMC gangs. An assessment by the Australian Criminal Intelligence Commission in September 2020 identified over 4,700 patched gang members and 1,000 prospects in 38 OMCGs.

New Zealand 
In June 2021 there were 8,061 gang members, across 25 gangs, according to information obtained from the New Zealand Gang Intelligence Centre, which holds the National Gang List. This is figure is almost double the 4,420 gang members, of 24 gangs, on the list in 2016. NZ Police attribute some of the increase to better methodology and recording processes but also noted that those who cease to be involved in a gang might not be removed from the list. On February 25, 2021, the NZ Police commissioner, Andrew Coster, advised the Justice Select Committee that he considered gang membership numbers derived from the gang list were inaccurate because it was easy for someone to be added to the list but difficult for them to be removed, short of death.

See also

 Prison gang
 Gang signal

By country:
 List of gangs in the United States
 Gangs in Australia
 Gangs in Canada
 Gangs in the United Kingdom
 Gangs in New Zealand

References

 http://www.insideprison.com/prison_gang_profile_TRINITARIOS.asp
 https://web.archive.org/web/20090212165246/http://gangrelated.net/resources/articles-mainmenu-92/124-trinitarios-overview-an-emerging-threat-on-the-east-coast.html
 http://www.nypost.com/seven/01142008/news/regionalnews/schools_gang_scourge_128917.htm

Further reading
 Thrasher, Frederick The Gang: A Study of 1,313 Gangs in Chicago, Chicago: University of Chicago Press, 1927 ASIN: B000IZWOBA
 Morales, Gabriel C. Varrio Warfare: Violence in the Latino Community, 1998  ASIN: B0018HRNHM
 Roberson, Cliff. Exploring Juvenile Justice, California: Wadsworth/Thompson Learning, 2000 
 Daniels, Peggy. ed. Gangs, Michigan: The Gale Group, 2008

Gangs
Crime
Criminology
Urban decay

cs:Gang
de:Bande (Gruppe)
et:Banditism
es:Pandilla
eo:Bando
fr:Bande criminelle
it:Gang
nl:Bende (misdaad)
ja:ストリートギャング
pl:Gang
pt:Gangue
ru:Бандитизм
scn:Cricca
sr:Банда
fi:Katujengi
sv:Gäng
zh:童黨